Apotoforma ptygma is a species of moth of the family Tortricidae. It is found in Mexico (San Luis Potosí).

The wingspan is about 16 mm. The ground colour of the forewings is pale brownish with the postmedian portion of the costal area and the terminal third of the wing more cream and the base of the wing darkened brownish grey. The costal spots are larger near the middle and are followed towards the dorsum by an indistinct shade. The subterminal spots are small. The hindwings are brownish.

References

Moths described in 1993
Tortricini
Moths of Central America